Still Electric is the Primitive Radio Gods' third album, released independently through their official site in early 2003. Still Electric once again shifts the general sound of the band, this time towards more shoegazing-esque alternative, laden with heavily layered guitars.

Still Electric was released in two editions: The first run, limited to only a hundred copies, were all numbered and signed by the band. This edition was released in early 2003. The unlimited edition, sometimes called the "Enfield Interceptor" run, released in 2004, had new cover art and shifted the order of the songs a bit, removing the song "Normalizer" entirely.

In addition to the two CD runs, the band also released an extremely limited edition Still Electric "Interactive Video Album" in late 2003. It included home-brewed music videos for all of the 11 original songs.

Track listing

 "Good Evening San Francisco"
 "What If I Sped?"
 "The Underground Solution"
 "Under the Greystar"
 "Up the Arbor"
 "Unspoken No"
 "Children of the Helmet Law"
 "Ripped in November"
 "Self-Serve Island"
 "Apso Foogin' Lootly"

First Edition ("Enfield Interceptor" Edition)
 "Normalizer"
 "What If I Sped?"
 "The Underground Solution"
 "Children of the Helmet Law"
 "Under the Greystar"
 "Good Evening, San Francisco"
 "Up the Arbor"
 "Unspoken No"
 "Ripped in November"
 "Self-Serve Island"
 "Apso Foogin' Lootly"

DVD Interactive Video Album
 "The Underground Solution"
 "What If I Sped?"
 "Normalizer"
 "Up the Arbor"
 "Good Evening, San Francisco"
 "Under the Greystar"
 "Ripped in November
 "Children of the Helmet Law"
 "Unspoken No"
 "Apso Foogin' Lootly"
 "Self-Serve Island"

Primitive Radio Gods albums
2003 albums
2003 video albums
Self-released albums